Poetry (founded as Poetry: A Magazine of Verse) has been published in Chicago since 1912. It is one of the leading monthly poetry journals in the English-speaking world. Founded by Harriet Monroe, it is now published by the Poetry Foundation. In 2007 the magazine had a circulation of 30,000, and printed 300 poems per year out of approximately 100,000 submissions. It is sometimes referred to as Poetry—Chicago.

Poetry has been financed since 2003 with a $200 million bequest from Ruth Lilly.

History
The magazine was founded in 1912 by Harriet Monroe, an author who was then working as an art critic for the Chicago Tribune. She wrote at that time:
"The Open Door will be the policy of this magazine—may the great poet we are looking for never find it shut, or half-shut, against his ample genius! To this end the editors hope to keep free from entangling alliances with any single class or school. They desire to print the best English verse which is being written today, regardless of where, by whom, or under what theory of art it is written. Nor will the magazine promise to limit its editorial comments to one set of opinions."

In a circular she sent to poets, Monroe said the magazine offered:
"First, a chance to be heard in their own place, without the limitations imposed by the popular magazine. In other words, while the ordinary magazines must minister to a large public little interested in poetry, this magazine will appeal to, and it may be hoped, will develop, a public primarily interested in poetry as an art, as the highest, most complete expression of truth and beauty."

"In the first decade of its existence, [Poetry] became the principal organ for modern poetry of the English-speaking world." T. S. Eliot's first professionally published poem, "The Love Song of J. Alfred Prufrock," was published in Poetry. Prufrock was brought to Monroe's attention by early contributor and foreign correspondent, Ezra Pound. The magazine published the early works of H.D., Robert Frost, Langston Hughes, Edna St. Vincent Millay and Marianne Moore. The magazine discovered such poets as Gwendolyn Brooks, James Merrill, and John Ashbery.

Contributors have included William Butler Yeats, Rabindranath Tagore, William Carlos Williams, Joyce Kilmer, Carl Sandburg, Charlotte Wilder, Robert Creeley, Wallace Stevens, Basil Bunting, Yone Noguchi, Carl Rakosi, Dorothy Richardson, Peter Viereck, Louis Zukofsky, Charles Reznikoff, E. E. Cummings, Frank O'Hara, Allen Ginsberg, Ernest Hemingway, James Joyce, Gertrude Stein, Elsa Gidlow, and Tennessee Williams, Max Michelson among others. The magazine was instrumental in launching the Imagist and Objectivist poetic movements.

A. R. Ammons once said, "the histories of modern poetry in America and of Poetry in America are almost interchangeable, certainly inseparable." However, in the early years, East Coast newspapers made fun of the magazine, with one calling the idea "Poetry in Porkopolis".

Author and poet Jessica Nelson North was an editor. Henry Rago joined the magazine in 1954 and became editor the following year.

The magazine first established its online presence in 1998 at poetrymagazine.org and, after a 2003 grant from Ruth Lilly, moved to poetryfoundation.org in 2005.

Publication in Poetry is highly selective and consists of three increasingly critical editorial rounds. With a publication rate of submissions at about 1%, the magazine is "one of the most difficult to get [published in]".

Lilly grant

Foundation

Monroe continued to publish the magazine, until her death in 1937. From 1941, until the establishment of the Foundation in 2003, the magazine's publisher went by the corporate name, the Modern Poetry Association. In 2003, the association received a grant from the estate of Ruth Lilly originally said to be worth over $100 million, but which grew to be about $200 million when it was given out. The grant added to her already substantial prior contributions.

The magazine learned in 2001 that it would be getting the grant. Before announcing the gift, the magazine waited a year and reconfigured its governing board, which had been concerned with fund-raising. The Poetry Foundation was created (replacing the Modern Poetry Association), and Joseph Parisi, who had been editor of the magazine for two decades, briefly headed the foundation. Christian Wiman, a young critic and poet, succeeded to the editorship in 2003.

Since receiving the grant, the magazine has increased its budget. For instance, poets who previously received two dollars per line now get ten. In addition, the magazine continues to give out eight annual author prizes for various types of publications that have appeared in the magazine, these range per endowment from $500 to $5000.

Poetry Foundation Building

Part of the Lilly grant was used to build the Poetry Center in Near North Side, Chicago. The Center, opened in 2011, holds a library open to the public, houses reading spaces, hosts school and tour groups, and provides office and editorial space for the Poetry Foundation and magazine.

Editorship under the Poetry Foundation

Christian Wiman took the editorship in 2003. Partly thanks to direct-mail campaigns, the magazine's circulation has grown from 11,000 to almost 30,000. The look of the magazine was redesigned in 2005.

Wiman "expressed in print a stern preference for formal poems, and a disdain for what he calls 'broken-prose confessionalism' and 'the generic, self-obsessed free-verse poetry of the seventies and eighties", according to a New Yorker magazine article.

One of his top goals for the magazine was to get more people "talking about it", he has said. "I tried to put something in every issue that would be provocative in some way." Wiman hired several young, outspoken critics and encouraged them to be frank. In 2005, Wiman wrote in an editorial: "Not only was there a great deal of obvious logrolling going on (friends reviewing friends, teachers promoting students, young poets writing strategic reviews of older poets in power), but the writing was just so polite, professional and dull. ... We wanted writers who wrote as if there were an audience of general readers out there who might be interested in contemporary poetry. That meant hiring critics with sharp opinions, broad knowledge of fields other than poetry, and some flair."

Wiman stepped down from the editorship June 30, 2013. Poet Don Share, senior editor under Wiman, became the Editor. Share stepped down in the summer of 2020, following a controversy over his decision to include a poem with racist language in an issue devoted to anti-racist poetry.  After a series of guest editors, poet Adrian Matejka, a writing professor, and past Indiana State Poet Laureate, was named editor in 2022.

Controversial article by John Barr

In September 2006, the magazine published an essay by John Barr, then president of the Poetry Foundation (2003–13), titled "American Poetry in the New Century," which became controversial, generating many complaints and some support. After having heard a talk Barr gave on the subject, Wiman had asked Barr to submit it to the magazine.

"American poetry is ready for something new because our poets have been writing in the same way for a long time now. There is fatigue, something stagnant about the poetry being written today," Barr wrote. He added that poetry is nearly absent from public life, and poets too often write with only other poets in mind, failing to write for a greater public. Although M.F.A. programs have expanded greatly, the result has been more poetry but also more limited variety. He wrote that poetry has become "neither robust, resonant, nor — and I stress this quality — entertaining."

Barr suggested that poets get experience outside the academy. "If you look at drama in Shakespeare's day, or the novel in the last century, or the movie today, it suggests that an art enters its golden age when it is addressed to and energized by the general audiences of its time."

Dana Goodyear, in an article in The New Yorker reporting and commenting on Poetry magazine and The Poetry Foundation, wrote that Barr's essay was directly counter to the ideas of the magazine's founder, Harriet Monroe, eight decades before. In a 1922 editorial, Monroe wrote about newspaper verse: "These syndicated rhymers, like the movie-producers, are learning that it pays to be good, [that one] gets by giving the people the emotions of virtue, simplicity and goodness, with this program paying at the box-office." Monroe wanted to protect poets from the demands of popular taste, Goodyear wrote, while Barr wants to induce poets to appeal to the public. Goodyear acknowledged that popular interest in poetry has collapsed since the time of Monroe's editorial.

Wiman said he agrees with a lot of what Barr says about contemporary poetry.

Awards
In 2011, and in 2014, Poetry won National Magazine Awards for General Excellence.

Legacy
A Beirut-based literary magazine, Shi'r, was named after Poetry.

See also
List of literary magazines

Notes and references
Specific references:

General references
Peter Jones (ed.): Imagist Poetry (Penguin, 1972).
Historical note at the magazine Web site
Boston Globe article on grant

External links

Poetry Foundation
Poetry: A Magazine of Verse (1911-1962) Records at the University of Chicago Special Collections Research Center
Poetry (1954-2002) Records at Indiana University
Poetry: A Magazine of Verse at the Modernist Journals Project: a cover-to-cover, searchable digital edition of the magazine's first ten years, from vol. 1, no. 1 (Oct. 1912) to vol. 21, no. 3 (Dec. 1922). PDFs of these 123 issues may be downloaded for free from the MJP website.
The Open Door: One Hundred Years of 'Poetry' Magazine – A poetry anthology celebrating the magazine's centennial anniversary, by Don Share and Christian Wiman

1912 establishments in Illinois
Monthly magazines published in the United States
Magazines established in 1912
Magazines published in Chicago
Poetry Foundation
Poetry magazines published in the United States